The 1980–81 Midland Football League was the 81st in the history of the Midland Football League, a football competition in England.

Premier Division

The Premier Division featured 17 clubs which competed in the previous season, along with one new club:
Guisborough Town, joined from the Northern Football Alliance

League table

Division One

Division One featured 15 clubs which competed in the previous season, along with one new club:
Folk House Old Boys

League table

References

Midland Football League (1889)
8